Luonan Xincun is a station on Shanghai Metro Line 7. It began operation on December 28, 2010.

The station is located in the town of Luodian, in Shanghai's Baoshan District.

References 
(Chinese) 罗南新村站建设用地规划许可证

Railway stations in Shanghai
Shanghai Metro stations in Baoshan District
Railway stations in China opened in 2010
Line 7, Shanghai Metro